Negative feedback (or balancing feedback) occurs when some function of the output of a system, process, or mechanism is fed back in a manner that tends to reduce the fluctuations in the output, whether caused by changes in the input or by other disturbances.

Whereas positive feedback tends to lead to instability via exponential growth, oscillation or chaotic behavior, negative feedback generally promotes stability. Negative feedback tends to promote a settling to equilibrium, and reduces the effects of perturbations. Negative feedback loops in which just the right amount of correction is applied with optimum timing can be very stable, accurate, and responsive.

Negative feedback is widely used in mechanical and electronic engineering, and also within living organisms, and can be seen in many other fields from chemistry and economics to physical systems such as the climate. General negative feedback systems are studied in control systems engineering.

Negative feedback loops also play an integral role in maintaining the atmospheric balance in various systems on Earth. One such feedback system is the interaction between solar radiation, cloud cover, and planet temperature.

General description 

In many physical and biological systems, qualitatively different influences can oppose each other. For example, in biochemistry, one set of chemicals drives the system in a given direction, whereas another set of chemicals drives it in an opposing direction. If one or both of these opposing influences are non-linear, equilibrium point(s) result.

In biology, this process (in general, biochemical) is often referred to as homeostasis; whereas in mechanics, the more common term is equilibrium.

In engineering, mathematics and the physical, and biological sciences, common terms for the points around which the system gravitates include: attractors, stable states, eigenstates/eigenfunctions, equilibrium points, and setpoints.

In control theory, negative refers to the sign of the multiplier in mathematical models for feedback. In delta notation, −Δoutput is added to or mixed into the input. In multivariate systems, vectors help to illustrate how several influences can both partially complement and partially oppose each other.

Some authors, in particular with respect to modelling business systems, use negative to refer to the reduction in difference between the desired and actual behavior of a system. In a psychology context, on the other hand, negative refers to the valence of the feedback – attractive versus aversive, or praise versus criticism.

In contrast, positive feedback is feedback in which the system responds so as to increase the magnitude of any particular perturbation, resulting in amplification of the original signal instead of stabilization. Any system in which there is positive feedback together with a gain greater than one will result in a runaway situation. Both positive and negative feedback require a feedback loop to operate.

However, negative feedback systems can still be subject to oscillations. This is caused by a phase shift around any loop. Due to these phase shifts the feedback signal of some frequencies can ultimately become in phase with the input signal and thus turn into positive feedback, creating a runaway condition. Even before the point where the phase shift becomes 180 degrees, stability of the negative feedback loop will become compromised, leading to increasing under- and overshoot following a disturbance. This problem is often dealt with by attenuating or changing the phase of the problematic frequencies in a design step called compensation. Unless the system naturally has sufficient damping, many negative feedback systems have low pass filters or dampers fitted.

Examples 
 Mercury thermostats (circa 1600) using expansion and contraction of columns of mercury in response to temperature changes were used in negative feedback systems to control vents in furnaces, maintaining a steady internal temperature.
 In the invisible hand of the market metaphor of economic theory (1776), reactions to price movements provide a feedback mechanism to match supply and demand.
 In centrifugal governors (1788), negative feedback is used to maintain a near-constant speed of an engine, irrespective of the load or fuel-supply conditions.
 In a steering engine (1866), power assistance is applied to the rudder with a feedback loop, to maintain the direction set by the steersman.
 In servomechanisms, the speed or position of an output, as determined by a sensor, is compared to a set value, and any error is reduced by negative feedback to the input.
 In audio amplifiers, negative feedback flattens frequency response, reduces distortion, minimises the effect of manufacturing variations in component parameters, and compensates for changes in characteristics due to temperature change.
 In analog computing, feedback around operational amplifiers is used to generate mathematical functions such as addition, subtraction, integration, differentiation, logarithm, and antilog functions.
 In a phase locked loop (1932), feedback is used to maintain a generated alternating waveform in a constant phase to a reference signal. In many implementations the generated waveform is the output, but when used as a demodulator in an FM radio receiver, the error feedback voltage serves as the demodulated output signal. If there is a frequency divider between the generated waveform and the phase comparator, the device acts as a frequency multiplier.
 In organisms, feedback enables various measures (e.g. body temperature, or blood sugar level) to be maintained within a desired range by homeostatic processes.

Detailed implementations

Error-controlled regulation

One use of feedback is to make a system (say T) self-regulating to minimize the effect of a disturbance (say D). Using a negative feedback loop, a measurement of some variable (for example, a  process variable, say E) is subtracted from a required value (the 'set point') to estimate an operational error in system status, which is then used by a regulator (say R) to reduce the gap between the measurement and the required value. The regulator modifies the input to the system T according to its interpretation of the error in the status of the system. This error may be introduced by a variety of possible disturbances or 'upsets', some slow and some rapid. The regulation in such systems can range from a simple 'on-off' control to a more complex processing of the error signal.

In this framework, the physical form of a signal may undergo multiple transformations. For example, a change in weather may cause a disturbance to the heat input to a house (as an example of the system T) that is monitored by a thermometer as a change in temperature (as an example of an 'essential variable' E). This quantity, then, is converted by the thermostat (a 'comparator') into an electrical error in status compared to the 'set point' S, and subsequently used by the regulator (containing a 'controller' that commands gas control valves and an ignitor) ultimately to change the heat provided by a furnace (an 'effector') to counter the initial weather-related disturbance in heat input to the house.

Error controlled regulation is typically carried out using a Proportional-Integral-Derivative Controller (PID controller). The regulator signal is derived from a weighted sum of the error signal, integral of the error signal, and derivative of the error signal. The weights of the respective components depend on the application.

Mathematically, the regulator signal is given by:

where
  is the integral time
  is the derivative time

Negative feedback amplifier

The negative feedback amplifier was invented by Harold Stephen Black at Bell Laboratories in 1927, and granted a patent in 1937 (US Patent 2,102,671  "a continuation of application Serial No. 298,155, filed August 8, 1928 ...").
"The patent is 52 pages long plus 35 pages of figures. The first 43 pages amount to a small treatise on feedback amplifiers!"

There are many advantages to feedback in amplifiers.  In design, the type of feedback and amount of feedback are carefully selected to weigh and optimize these various benefits.

Advantages of negative voltage feedback in amplifiers
 It reduces non-linear distortion, that is, it has higher fidelity.
 It increases circuit stability: that is, the gain remains stable though there are variations in ambient temperature, frequency and signal amplitude.
 It increases bandwidth slightly.
 It modifies the input and output impedances.
 Harmonic, phase, amplitude, and frequency distortions are all reduced considerably.
 Noise is reduced considerably.

Though negative feedback has many advantages, amplifiers with feedback can oscillate. See the article on step response. They may even exhibit instability. Harry Nyquist of Bell Laboratories proposed the Nyquist stability criterion and the Nyquist plot that identify stable feedback systems, including amplifiers and control systems.

The figure shows a simplified block diagram of a negative feedback amplifier.

The feedback sets the overall (closed-loop) amplifier gain at a value:

where the approximate value assumes βA  >> 1. This expression shows that a gain greater than one requires β < 1. Because the approximate gain 1/β is independent of the open-loop gain A, the feedback is said to 'desensitize' the closed-loop gain to variations in A  (for example, due to manufacturing variations between units, or temperature effects upon components), provided only that the gain A is sufficiently large. In this context, the factor (1+βA) is often called the 'desensitivity factor', and in the broader context of feedback effects that include other matters like electrical impedance and bandwidth, the 'improvement factor'.

If the disturbance D is included, the amplifier output becomes:

which shows that the feedback reduces the effect of the disturbance by the 'improvement factor' (1+β A). The disturbance D might arise from fluctuations in the amplifier output due to noise and nonlinearity (distortion) within this amplifier, or from other noise sources such as power supplies.

The difference signal I–βO at the amplifier input is sometimes called the "error signal". According to the diagram, the error signal is:

From this expression, it can be seen that a large 'improvement factor' (or a large loop gain βA) tends to keep this error signal small.

Although the diagram illustrates the principles of the negative feedback amplifier, modeling a real amplifier as a unilateral forward amplification block and a unilateral feedback block has significant limitations. For methods of analysis that do not make these idealizations, see the article Negative feedback amplifier.

Operational amplifier circuits

The operational amplifier was originally developed as a building block for the construction of analog computers, but is now used almost universally in all kinds of applications including audio equipment and control systems.

Operational amplifier circuits typically employ negative feedback to get a predictable transfer function. Since the open-loop gain of an op-amp is extremely large, a small differential input signal would drive the output of the amplifier to one rail or the other in the absence of negative feedback. A simple example of the use of feedback is the op-amp voltage amplifier shown in the figure.

The idealized model of an operational amplifier assumes that the gain is infinite, the input impedance is infinite, output resistance is zero, and input offset currents and voltages are zero. Such an ideal amplifier draws no current from the resistor divider.  
Ignoring dynamics (transient effects and propagation delay), the infinite gain of the ideal op-amp means this feedback circuit drives the voltage difference between the two op-amp inputs to zero. Consequently, the voltage gain of the circuit in the diagram, assuming an ideal op amp, is the reciprocal of feedback voltage division ratio β:

.

A real op-amp has a high but finite gain A at low frequencies, decreasing gradually at higher frequencies. In addition, it exhibits a finite input impedance and a non-zero output impedance. Although practical op-amps are not ideal, the model of an ideal op-amp often suffices to understand circuit operation at low enough frequencies. 
As discussed in the previous section, the feedback circuit stabilizes the closed-loop gain and desensitizes the output to fluctuations generated inside the amplifier itself.

Areas of application

Mechanical engineering 

An example of the use of negative feedback control is the ballcock control of water level (see diagram), or a pressure regulator. In modern engineering, negative feedback loops are found in engine governors, fuel injection systems and carburettors. Similar control mechanisms are used in heating and cooling systems, such as those involving air conditioners, refrigerators, or freezers.

Biology 

Some biological systems exhibit negative feedback such as the baroreflex in blood pressure regulation and erythropoiesis. Many biological processes (e.g., in the human anatomy) use negative feedback. Examples of this are numerous, from the regulating of body temperature, to the regulating of blood glucose levels. The disruption of feedback loops can lead to undesirable results: in the case of blood glucose levels, if negative feedback fails, the glucose levels in the blood may begin to rise dramatically, thus resulting in diabetes.

For hormone secretion regulated by the negative feedback loop: when gland X releases hormone X, this stimulates target cells to release hormone Y. When there is an excess of hormone Y, gland X "senses" this and inhibits its release of hormone X. As shown in the figure, most endocrine hormones are controlled by a physiologic negative feedback inhibition loop, such as the glucocorticoids secreted by the adrenal cortex.  The hypothalamus secretes corticotropin-releasing hormone (CRH), which directs the anterior pituitary gland to secrete adrenocorticotropic hormone (ACTH).  In turn, ACTH directs the adrenal cortex to secrete glucocorticoids, such as cortisol.  Glucocorticoids not only perform their respective functions throughout the body but also negatively affect the release of further stimulating secretions of both the hypothalamus and the pituitary gland, effectively reducing the output of glucocorticoids once a sufficient amount has been released.

Chemistry 

Closed systems containing substances undergoing a reversible chemical reaction can also exhibit negative feedback in accordance with Le Chatelier's principle which shift the chemical equilibrium to the opposite side of the reaction in order to reduce a stress. For example, in the reaction 
 N2 + 3 H2 ⇌ 2 NH3 + 92 kJ/mol
If a mixture of the reactants and products exists at equilibrium in a sealed container and nitrogen gas is added to this system, then the equilibrium will shift toward the product side in response. If the temperature is raised, then the equilibrium will shift toward the reactant side which, since the reverse reaction is endothermic, will partially reduce the temperature.

Self-organization

Self-organization is the capability of certain systems "of organizing their own behavior or structure". There are many possible factors contributing to this capacity, and most often positive feedback is identified as a possible contributor. However, negative feedback also can play a role.

Economics 

In economics, automatic stabilisers are government programs that are intended to work as negative feedback to dampen fluctuations in real GDP.

Mainstream economics asserts that the market pricing mechanism operates to match supply and demand, because mismatches between them feed back into the decision-making of suppliers and demanders of goods, altering prices and thereby reducing any discrepancy. However Norbert Wiener wrote in 1948:

"There is a belief current in many countries and elevated to the rank of an official article of faith in the United States that free competition is itself a homeostatic process... Unfortunately the evidence, such as it is, is against this simple-minded theory."

The notion of economic equilibrium being maintained in this fashion by market forces has also been questioned by numerous heterodox economists such as financier George Soros and leading ecological economist and steady-state theorist  Herman Daly, who was with the World Bank in 1988–1994.

Environmental Science 
A basic and common example of a negative feedback system in the environment is the interaction among cloud cover, plant growth, solar radiation, and planet temperature. As incoming solar radiation increases, planet temperature increases. As the temperature increases, the amount of plant life that can grow increases. This plant life can then make products such as sulfur which produce more cloud cover. An increase in cloud cover leads to higher albedo, or surface reflectivity, of the Earth. As albedo increases, however, the amount of solar radiation decreases. This, in turn, affects the rest of the cycle.

Cloud cover, and in turn planet albedo and temperature, is also influenced by the hydrological cycle. As planet temperature increases, more water vapor is produced, creating more clouds. The clouds then block incoming solar radiation, lowering the temperature of the planet. This interaction produces less water vapor and therefore less cloud cover. The cycle then repeats in a negative feedback loop. In this way, negative feedback loops in the environment have a stabilizing effect.

History 
Negative feedback as a control technique may be seen in the refinements of the water clock introduced by Ktesibios of Alexandria in the 3rd century BCE. Self-regulating mechanisms have existed since antiquity, and were used to maintain a constant level in the reservoirs of water clocks as early as 200 BCE.

Negative feedback was implemented in the 17th century. Cornelius Drebbel had built thermostatically controlled incubators and ovens in the early 1600s, and centrifugal governors were used to regulate the distance and pressure between millstones in windmills. James Watt patented a form of governor in 1788 to control the speed of his steam engine, and James Clerk Maxwell in 1868 described "component motions" associated with these governors that lead to a decrease in a disturbance or the amplitude of an oscillation.

The term "feedback" was well established by the 1920s, in reference to a means of boosting the gain of an electronic amplifier. Friis and Jensen described this action as "positive feedback" and made passing mention of a contrasting "negative feed-back action" in 1924. Harold Stephen Black came up with the idea of using negative feedback in electronic amplifiers in 1927, submitted a patent application in 1928, and detailed its use in his paper of 1934, where he defined negative feedback as a type of coupling that reduced the gain of the amplifier, in the process greatly increasing its stability and bandwidth.

Karl Küpfmüller published papers on a negative-feedback-based automatic gain control system and a feedback system stability criterion in 1928.

Nyquist and Bode built on Black's work to develop a theory of amplifier stability.

Early researchers in the area of cybernetics subsequently generalized the idea of negative feedback to cover any goal-seeking or purposeful behavior.

Cybernetics pioneer Norbert Wiener helped to formalize the concepts of feedback control, defining feedback in general as "the chain of the transmission and return of information", and negative feedback as the case when:

While the view of feedback as any "circularity of action" helped to keep the theory simple and consistent, Ashby pointed out that, while it may clash with definitions that require a "materially evident" connection, "the exact definition of feedback is nowhere important". Ashby pointed out the limitations of the concept of "feedback":

To reduce confusion, later authors have suggested alternative terms such as degenerative, self-correcting, balancing, or discrepancy-reducing in place of "negative".

See also

References

External links 

Control theory
Cybernetics
Signal processing
Analog circuits
Feedback